Macfarlane River or MacFarlane River may refer to:

MacFarlane River (Ontario) in Ontario, Canada
Macfarlane River (New Zealand)